Nicola Tranfaglia (Italy, 2 October 1938 – 23 July 2021) was an Italian politician who served as a member of the Chamber of Deputies.

References

1938 births
2021 deaths
Italian politicians
Party of Italian Communists politicians
Deputies of Legislature XV of Italy
University of Naples Federico II alumni
Academic staff of the University of Turin
People from Naples